Defending champion Roger Federer defeated Novak Djokovic in the final, 7–6(7–1), 6–3, to win the men's singles tennis title at the 2015 Cincinnati Masters. He won the title without losing a set or having his serve broken for the second time, after 2012. It marked the first time Federer defeated the world No. 1 and No. 2 players in consecutive matches en route to a title. It was Djokovic's fifth runner-up finish without winning the title.

Seeds
The top eight seeds receive a bye into the second round. 

 Novak Djokovic (final)
 Roger Federer (champion)
 Andy Murray (semifinals)
 Kei Nishikori (withdrew because of fatigue)
 Stan Wawrinka (quarterfinals)
 Tomáš Berdych (quarterfinals)
 Marin Čilić (third round)
 Rafael Nadal  (third round)
 Milos Raonic (first round)
 Gilles Simon (first round)
 John Isner (first round)
 Richard Gasquet (quarterfinals)
 David Goffin (third round)
 Gaël Monfils (first round)
 Kevin Anderson (third round)
 Grigor Dimitrov (third round)

Draw

Finals

Top half

Section 1

Section 2

Bottom half

Section 3

Section 4

Qualifying

Seeds

Qualifiers

Lucky loser
  Benoît Paire

Qualifying draw

First qualifier

Second qualifier

Third qualifier

Fourth qualifier

Fifth qualifier

Sixth qualifier

Seventh qualifier

References

Main Draw
Qualifying Draw

Men's Singles